Schenken is a surname. Notable people with the surname include:

Howard Schenken (1903–1979), American bridge player
Tim Schenken (born 1943), Australian race car driver

See also
Schenke